Gerardo Rosario (born 14 August 1952) is a Filipino former swimmer who has competed in the Summer Olympic Games.

Career
Rosario competed in the Summer Olympics, competing for his home country Philippines in the 1972 and 1976 editions.

Rosario was also a competitor in the Asian Games, first competing in the 1974 Asian Games in Tehran where he won two silvers in the 100-meter and 200-meter back stroke, and three bronzes in the 4x100-meter and 4x200-meter freestyle relays, and the 4x100-meter medley relay.
He is also the gold medalist for the 200-meter men's freestyle event of the 1978 Asian Games. He also won two bronzes in the 4x100-meter medley relay and 4x200-meter freestyle relay.

He was coached by Rick Powers.

Post-retirement
In 2016, Rosario, along with 16 others, was inducted in the Philippine Sports Hall of Fame.

Rosario was elected as corporate secretary of Philippine Swimming, Inc. (PSI; then known as Philippine Amateur Swimming Association or PASA), the governing body of swimming in the Philippines, in 2010. In April 2017, Rosario was designated as Officer in Charge or Acting President of PSI.

References

External links
 

1952 births
Living people
Filipino male swimmers
Filipino male freestyle swimmers
Male backstroke swimmers
Olympic swimmers of the Philippines
Swimmers at the 1972 Summer Olympics
Swimmers at the 1976 Summer Olympics
Asian Games medalists in swimming
Asian Games gold medalists for the Philippines
Asian Games silver medalists for the Philippines
Asian Games bronze medalists for the Philippines
Swimmers at the 1974 Asian Games
Swimmers at the 1978 Asian Games
Medalists at the 1974 Asian Games
Medalists at the 1978 Asian Games
Philippine Sports Hall of Fame inductees